Noel Murphy (born 1952) is an Irish retired Gaelic footballer who played for Cork Championship club Bishopstown. He was a member of the Cork senior football team for two seasons, during which time he usually lined out as a goalkeeper.

At inter-county level, Murphy was part of the successful Cork junior team that won the All-Ireland Championship in 1972. He joined the Cork senior team during the 1972-73 National League and served as understudy to regular goalkeeper Billy Morgan for two seasons. During that time Murphy was sub-goalkeeper on Cork's 1973 All-Ireland Championship-winning team. He also secured two Munster Championship medals.

Honours

University College Cork
Sigerson Cup (1): 1972
Munster Senior Club Football Championship (1): 1971

Bishopstown
Cork Intermediate Football Championship (1): 1974

Cork
All-Ireland Senior Football Championship (1): 1973
Munster Senior Football Championship (2): 1973, 1974
All-Ireland Junior Football Championship (1): 1972
Munster Junior Football Championship (1): 1972

References

1952 births
Living people
Bishopstown Gaelic footballers
UCC Gaelic footballers
Cork inter-county Gaelic footballers
Gaelic football goalkeepers